Confidential Assignment is a 2017 South Korean action comedy film directed by Kim Sung-hoon. It stars Hyun Bin, Yoo Hae-jin and Kim Joo-hyuk. In the film, a North Korean officer and a Seoul detective team up to track down a dangerous fugitive, who is running a gang of  counterfeiters.

Plot
Im Cheol-ryung, an officer of a special investigation team in North Korea, barges at a warehouse that prints counterfeit money, where he learns that his superior Cha Ki-seong and his own team are there to steal the master plates to print the counterfeit money. A shootout ensues where Cheol-ryung's wife Hwa-ryung and his team are killed, while Cheol-ryung is gravely injured. 

Meanwhile, the North Korean officials learn that Cha Ki-seong has fled to South Korea, where Cheol-ryung is ordered to capture Ki-seong and retrieve the stolen master plates, and is given only three days to complete his mission. However, the South Korean officials suspects whether Ki-seong is really a killer, where they assign Detective Kang Jin-tae from Seoul to watch over Cheol-ryung tightly as they suspect him to kill Ki-seong for vengeance. Jin-tae receives Cheol-ryung from the airport, where they head for Myeong-Dong to check on one of Ki-seong's men Park Myung-ho, but Cheol-ryong escapes after learning about Jin-tae's mission. Cheol-ryung arrives at Myeong-Dong to Jongro where Jin-tae also reaches there and interrogates Park, but the latter escapes. After the orders from his superior, Jin-tae takes Cheol-ryung to his home to spy on him. 

Having guessed the latter's plan, Cheol-ryung removes the SIM card which Jin-tae had inserted in his phone to track his location anytime. The duo learns about the location where Park was supplying drugs and a fight ensues where Cheol-ryung takes one of the men's phone and gives it to Jin-tae. Cheol-ryung learns about Park's location after secretly bugging Jin-tae's phone. The duo heads to the restaurant where they find that Park is conversing with one of Ki-seong's comrades (who was present at the warehouse). The comrade learns that Park plans to settle in South Korea, where he kills him under Ki-seong's orders. Cheol-ryung arrives and warns Ki-seong of his impending death, where he fights the comrade, who escapes. After checking Park's belongings, the officials learn about Cheol-ryung's mission. 

Meanwhile, Jin-tae learns about Cheol-ryung's past and decide to help him. They reach the place where Ki-seong has arranged a deal to sell the plates, but Ki-seong kills the buyer where Cheol-ryung arrives and kills the henchmen where he is about Ki-seong, but Jin-tae stops him which gives time for Ki-seong to escape. Cheol-ryung takes the master plates and leaves. However, Ki-seong kidnaps Jin-tae's family and demands the plates. A frightened Jin-tae tells Cheol-ryung, where he takes the plates and heads to the location. Jin-tae and Cheol-ryung arrives and gives the plates to Ki-seong, who leaves Jin-tae's family where Jin-tae takes his family to a safe place. A battle ensues where Cheol-ryung and Jin-tae manages to kill Ki-seong. One year later, Cheol-ryung and Jin-tae receive their next mission.

Cast
Hyun Bin as Im Cheol-ryung
Yoo Hae-jin as Kang Jin-tae
Kim Joo-hyuk as Cha Ki-seong
Jang Young-nam as Park So-yeon
Im Yoon-ah as Park Min-young
Lee Dong-hwi as Park Myung-ho
Oh Eui-shik as Lee Dae-pal	
Kong Jung-hwan as Sung-kang
Lee Hae-young as Chief Pyo
Park Min-ha as Kang Yeon-ah
Jun Gook-hwan as Won Hyung-sool
Um Hyo-sup as Chairman Yoon
Lee Yi-kyung as Lee Dong-hoon
Shin Hyun-bin as Hwa-ryung
Park Jin-woo as Jang Chil-bok
Park Hyung-soo as National Intelligence Service executive
Kim Jun-han as NIS agent
Eum Moon-suk as Troops #4

Reception
Confidential Assignment opened in second place at the box office on January 18. It rose to first place in its second week selling an accumulative four million tickets by January 30 and surpassed the five million mark two days later.

The movie became the most viewed Korean movie during the first half of 2017 by attracting 7.8 million audience domestically. However, this record was surpassed in August by A Taxi Driver.

International
Confidential Assignment was sold to 42 territories, including the U.S. and several countries in Asia.

 In US on January 27, 2017
 In Canada on February 3
 In Australia and New Zealand on February 9
 In Hong Kong and Macao on February 16
 In Taiwan on February 17
 In Vietnam on March 3
 In Thailand on April 13
In India on November 25

Awards and nominations

Sequel
Confidential Assignment 2: International, a sequel was announced on August 24, 2020. Filming started on February 18, 2021 and was released on September 7, 2022.

References

External links
 
 
 
 

2017 films
2010s buddy comedy films
2010s buddy cop films
CJ Entertainment films
South Korean films about revenge
Films set in Pyongyang
Films set in South Korea
Films shot in South Korea
South Korean action comedy films
South Korean buddy comedy films
South Korean crime action films
South Korean crime comedy films
2017 crime action films
2017 action comedy films
Counterfeit money in film
2017 comedy films
2010s South Korean films